The Peruvian Air Force (FAP) is the branch of the Peruvian Armed Forces tasked with defending the nation and its interests through the use of air power. Additional missions include assistance in safeguarding internal security, conducting disaster relief operations and participating in international peacekeeping operations.

History

20th century 

During the Colombia-Peru War of 1933, its Vought O2U Corsair and Curtiss F11C Hawk planes fought in the Amazon region. The CAP lost three aircraft to the Colombian Air Force. The corps was renamed  (Peruvian Aeronautical Corps, also abbreviated CAP) on March 12, 1936.

Ecuadorian–Peruvian War
In 1941, the CAP participated in the Ecuadorian–Peruvian War. At that time, the CAP were equipped with Caproni Ca.114 and North American NA.50  fighters, Douglas DB-8A-3P attack aircraft, and Caproni Ca.135  and Caproni Ca.310  bombers, among others.

The Peruvian Air Force had also established a paratroop unit during the war and used it to great effect by seizing the strategic Ecuadorian port city of Puerto Bolívar, on July 27, 1941, marking the first time in the Americas that airborne troops were used in combat.

Lieutenant José Quiñones Gonzales was a Peruvian pilot during the war. 
On July 23, 1941, his plane, a North American NA-50 fighter, was hit while performing a low-level attack on an Ecuadorian border post on the banks of the Zarumilla river. According to traditional Peruvian accounts, Quiñones, upon being hit by ground fire, crashed his damaged aircraft deliberately into the Ecuadorian anti-aircraft position, destroying it. He was promoted posthumously to captain, and is today considered a National Hero of Peru.

Cold War

Peru was an ally of the United States during this period, and was predominantly equipped with aircraft built in the US and Great Britain. By the end of General Odria's presidency,  the FAP ushered in the Jet Age with the introduction of English Electric Canberra bombers and Hawker Hunter, Lockheed F-80 Shooting Star and North American F-86 Sabre fighters.

However, on October 3, 1968, a military junta led by pro-Soviet Peruvian Army General Juan Velasco Alvarado organized a swift and bloodless coup d'état against president Fernando Belaúnde Terry. Velasco aligned Peru more closely with the Soviet Bloc and relations with the United States deteriorated. The US declared an arms embargo in 1969, making it difficult to obtain spare parts for Peru's American weaponry. In the 1970s and 1980s, Peru turned to the Soviet Union for its military hardware. During this time, the FAP acquired several Soviet-made aircraft, including Sukhoi Su-22 fighters, Antonov An-26 and An-32 transport aircraft, as well as Mil Mi-8, Mi-17, Mi-25 and Mi-26 helicopters. Soviet advisors were also dispatched to Peru.

Velasco was overthrown by other military officers in 1975 and Belaúnde returned to power as a civilian president in 1980. The FAP purchased the French-made Mirage 5P and 5DP and the Mirage 2000 in 1984. Relations improved with the United States and the FAP obtained American aircraft like the Cessna A-37B Dragonfly attack aircraft, as well as Lockheed Corporation C-130 and L-100-20 Hercules transport aircraft.

Stagnation

The stagnation of the Peruvian economy during the late 1980s and early 1990s forced cost reductions and the downsizing of the fleet size.
Budget cuts in training meant Peruvian pilots had a low number of annual flying hours (AFH) per pilot if compared to the 1970s. The number of annual flying hours is of course very important in estimating the individual skill and experience of the pilots of an air force: more annual flying hours suggests better trained pilots and general readiness.
There are also a number of possible explanations for FAP's low AFH: concern over the aging of equipment, scarcity of spare parts – especially for the older aircraft – difficulties with worn airframes and the scarcity of fuel are all contributing factors. It is very likely however that some 'elite' pilots and regiments such as those based in Talara AFB and La Joya AFB received considerably more flying hours. Especially since those regiments until today are equipped with modern aircraft and tasked with homeland defence.

Cenepa War

The Peruvian Air Force participated in the 1995 Cenepa War against Ecuador's Air Force in the Amazon Basin. It provided aerial support to the Peruvian army, carrying out bombings with Mi-25 helicopters, Canberra bombers, A-37 and Su-22. Due to a lack of reliable roads, troops were transported by Mi-17 helicopters, L-100 Hercules, An-28 and An-32. During the course of the war, at least two helicopters were shot down.

Fujimori government 

In 1997 and 1998 the FAP's outlook started to change for the better. In order to achieve Fujimori's militarily bold plans, it meant that FAP required a much-needed general overhaul and new purchases.

In 1997 the FAP acquired from Belarus 21 MiG-29 fighters and 18 Su-25 attack fighters. In 1998 an additional 3 MiG-29 fighters were bought from Russia, which, along with the 12 Mirage 2000 fighters purchased from France's Dassault Aviation in 1984, made a total of 54 fighters in Peru's inventory.

These purchases were expensive and a number of observers questioned their usefulness against more pressing security concerns at the time such as the fanatical Marxist guerillas, the Sendero Luminoso group (translated as Shining Path). On the other hand, the FAP still remembered the 1995 Cenepa War with Ecuador, and stationed its MiG-29s close to the border at Chiclayo AFB and Talara AFB.

21st Century 
Peru's Mirage 2000C/B and MiG-29S fighters form the backbone of its current multirole fighter fleet, alongside specialized Su-25 close air support jets. Its Mirage 2000Ps sit at La Joya AFB near the border with Bolivia and Chile; the 3 Andean countries have a minor 3-way maritime borders dispute, and residual tensions with historical foe Chile have been a long-running issue in Peru.

RAC MiG began the upgrade of FAP's MiG fleet to the MiG-29SMT external link standard in 2008. In 2009, Dassault began working with Peru on a comprehensive inspection of the Mirage fleet, coupled with some electronics modernization.

Since 2013 Peru is in talks with European suppliers as part of a long-term plan of replacing FAP's aging air force aircraft with second-hand Su-35s, Rafales or Eurofighters. Hitherto, FAP was exploring the possibility of buying as many as sixty Eurofighter Typhoon EF-2000 from Spain and sixty Sukhoi Su-35 from Russia. Cost was a major issue for Peruvian President Ollanta Humala, who was looking at competitively priced fighter jets that would fit the national budget. Peru is in hoping to buy 16 Eurofighters from Spain each for $61million. In 2014, Peru began to update the operations and mechanical equipment of its Cessna A-37 aircraft, replacing analog controls with new digital hardware. Peru has been evaluating multiple helicopters to modernize, replace previous utility helicopters and search and rescue operations with the Italian made, AW139. The purchase would consist of 12 helicopters for a total of $193million.

Following the unveiling of the KAI KF-21 Boramae in April 2021, The National Interest reported that Peru may be a potential customer for the 4.5 generation fighter.

Organization

Air Wing Nº 1 
Air Group Nº 6 – headquarters: Chiclayo
 Air Squadron 612 ("Fighting Roosters" combat squadron operating MiG-29S | MiG-29SE | MiG-29SMP | MiG-29UBP)
Air Group Nº 7 – headquarters: Piura
 Air Squadron 711 ("Scorpions" combat squadron operating Cessna A-37 Dragonfly)
Air Group Nº 11 – headquarters: Talara
 Air Squadron 112 ("Tigers" combat squadron operating Su-25UB)

Air Wing Nº 2
Air Group Nº 3 – headquarters: Callao
 315 Helicopter Squadron (operating MBB Bo 105)
 Helicopter Squadron 332 (operating Bell 212, Agusta-Bell AB-412SP)
 Helicopter Squadron 341 (operating Mi-8 MTV-1, Mi-17 H/1B | Mi-171Sh)
Air Group Nº 8 – headquarters: Callao
 Transport Squadron 841 (operating Boeing B-737-200 , Boeing 737-500)
 Transport Squadron 842 (operating L-100-20 Hercules)
 Transport Squadron 843 (operating An-32B)
 Transport Squadron 844 (operating C-27J Spartan)
Directorate of Air Surveillance and Recognition (DIVRA) & National Aerial Photography Service (SAN) – Headquarters: Lima
 Air Squadron 330 (operating UAS FAP Mk1, Mk2, Mk3, Mk4, Drone FAP Mk5 and Mk6)
 Air Squadron 331 (operating Learjet 35 equipped with metric aerial cameras Leica RC-30 and GPS Trimble R7 GNSS)
 Air Squadron 334 (operating Fairchild C-26 Metroliner, Twin Commander 690B)
EFOPI – Pilot Training School (former Air Group Nº 51) – Headquarters: Pisco
 Air Squadron 510 (basic training operating Schweizer S-300C)
 Air Squadron 511 (basic training operating Zlin Z-242)
 Air Squadron 512 (basic training operating KAI KT-1P)
 Air Squadron 513 (advanced training operating KAI KT-1P)

Air Wing Nº 3
Grupo Aéreo Nº 2 – headquarters: Vítor (Arequipa)
 Air Squadron 211 (Attack Helicopter Squadron "Dragons of the Air" operating Mi-25 D/DU and Mi-35 P)
Grupo Aéreo Nº 4 – headquarters: La Joya (Arequipa)
 Air Squadron 412 ("Hawks" combat squadron operating Mirage 2000 P/DP)
Command School FAP – headquarters: La Joya (Arequipa)
Puerto Maldonado Air Base
Tacna Air Detachment

Air Wing Nº 4
Air Group Nº 42 – headquarters: Iquitos
 Air Squadron 421 (operating DHC-6 and Y-12)
 Air Squadron 422 (operating PC-6)
Santa Clara Air Base – headquarters: Iquitos

Personnel

Ranks

Commissioned officers

NCOs and enlisted

Aircraft

Current inventory

Infantry weapons

See also
 Cenepa War
 Ecuadorian–Peruvian War
 Falso Paquisha War
 José Quiñones Gonzales

Notes

Sources
Cobas, Efraín, Las Fuerzas Armadas Peruanas en el Siglo XXI. CESLA, 2003.
Marchessini, Alejo, "La Fuerza Aérea del Perú"; Defensa 295: 30–42 (November 2002).
Marchessini, Alejo, "La aviación de combate de origen ruso de la FAP"; Defensa 342: 34–36 (October 2006).
Marchessini, Alejo, "El Servicio de Material de Guerra de la FAP"; Defensa 355: 48–50 (November 2007).

External links

Official Air Force of Peru Website
Peruvian military aircraft Order of Battle
Aeroflight
Maquina de Combate
Order of Battle at Scramble
World Air Forces

 
1929 establishments in Peru